Aureitalea is a Gram-negative, obligately aerobic and heterotrophic genus of bacteria from the family of Flavobacteriaceae with one known species, Aureitalea marina. A. marina has been isolated from seawater from the western North Pacific Ocean.

References

Flavobacteria
Bacteria genera
Monotypic bacteria genera
Taxa described in 2012